This is a list of gliders/sailplanes of the world, (this reference lists all gliders with references, where available)
Note: Any aircraft can glide for a short time, but gliders are designed to glide for longer.

Finnish miscellaneous constructors 
 Adaridi SK-24 - 1924 Finland - ADARIDI, Boris
 Alanne Motorlerche – Pentti Alanne
 Eiri-Avion PIK-20
 Fibera KK-1e Utu – designer Ahto Anttila
 IKV-3 Kotka – Ilmailukerho Vasama – Finland
 Gluhareff 3M – Gluhareff M. S., Helsingfors
 Gluhareff S-22 – Adaridy, H. – Gluhareff M. S., Helsingfors
 Älands Flygklubb glider
 Tervamäki JT-6 TERVAMÄKI, Jukka
 Tervamäki JT-8 TERVAMÄKI, Jukka

Notes

Further reading

External links

Lists of glider aircraft
Gliders
Finnish sailplanes